Nadziejewo  is a village in the administrative district of Gmina Czarne, within Człuchów County, Pomeranian Voivodeship, in northern Poland. It is located within the historic region of Pomerania.

The village has a population of 183.

Nadziejewo was a royal village of the Polish Crown, administratively located in the Człuchów County in the Pomeranian Voivodeship. During World War II the Germans operated a labor camp for prisoners of war from the Stalag II-B prisoner-of-war camp in the village.

References

Nadziejewo